Església de Sant Esteve  is a church located on Plaça del Príncep Benlloch in Andorra la Vella, Andorra. It is a heritage property registered in the Cultural Heritage of Andorra. It was built in the 11th-12th century and then restored in the 20th century.

References

Buildings and structures in Andorra la Vella
Roman Catholic churches in Andorra
Cultural Heritage of Andorra